Bagnoli del Trigno is a comune (municipality) in the Province of Isernia in the Italian region Molise, located about  northwest of Campobasso and about  northeast of Isernia.

Bagnoli del Trigno borders the following municipalities: Civitanova del Sannio, Duronia, Pietracupa, Salcito.

Sights include the Romanesque , built in the 13th-14th centuries between two rock spurs.

People
Annibale Ciarniello

References

Cities and towns in Molise